Pool A of the 2015 Fed Cup Asia/Oceania Group I was one of two pools in the Asia/Oceania Group I of the 2015 Fed Cup. Three teams competed in a round robin competition, with the top team and the bottom two teams proceeding to their respective sections of the play-offs: the top team played for advancement to the World Group II Play-offs, while the bottom team faced potential relegation to Group II.

Standings

Round-robin

Japan vs. South Korea

Uzbekistan vs. Hong Kong

Japan vs. Hong Kong

Uzbekistan vs. South Korea

Japan vs. Uzbekistan

Hong Kong vs. South Korea

References

External links 
 Fed Cup website

A1